Guni may refer to:

People
 Guni Israeli (born 1984), Israeli basketball player
 Nox Guni, Zimbabwean musician

Places
 Guni, Republic of Dagestan, Russia
 Guni, Vedensky District, Russia
 Guni, Zanjan, Iran

See also
 Guni-Guni